Events from the year 1822 in Ireland.

Events
 22 April – The Albion, a Black Ball Line trans-Atlantic packet, is driven ashore at Old Head of Kinsale with the loss of 46 of the 54 aboard.
 7 June – The Constitution; or, Cork Morning Post begins publication.
 21 September – HMS Confiance, a Royal Navy  of 1813, is wrecked between Mizen Head and Three Castles Head near Crookhaven with the loss of all 100 aboard.
 Public gas lighting in Belfast. 
 Mary Leadbeater's Cottage Biography, being a Collection of Lives of the Irish Peasantry is published.

Births
16 February – James Thomson, engineer and physicist (died 1892).
21 February – Richard Bourke, 6th Earl of Mayo, statesman, three times Chief Secretary for Ireland, Viceroy of India (assassinated 1872 in the Andaman Islands).
31 August – Timothy Anglin, politician in Canada and Speaker of the House of Commons of Canada (died 1896).
September – Denis Dynon, soldier, recipient of the Victoria Cross for gallantry in 1857 at Chota Behar, India (died 1863).
2 October – James Pearson, soldier, recipient of the Victoria Cross for gallantry in 1858 at Jhansi, India (died 1900).
11 October – Alexander John Arbuthnot, British official in India and writer (died 1907).
November – John Divane, soldier, recipient of the Victoria Cross for gallantry in 1857 at Delhi, India (died 1888).
4 December – Frances Power Cobbe, social reformer, feminist theorist, pioneer animal rights activist and writer (died 1904).
11 December – John Nicholson, military hero in India (died 1857).
Full date unknown
James Byrne, soldier, recipient of the Victoria Cross for gallantry in 1858 at Jhansi, India (died 1872).
Maxwell Henry Close, geologist (died 1903).
Joseph Philip Ronayne, civil engineer (died 1876).

Deaths
15 February – Pierce Butler, soldier, planter, statesman, one of United States' Founding Fathers, represented South Carolina in the Continental Congress and the U.S. Senate (born 1744).
25 March – Robert Blake, dentist, first State Dentist of Dublin (born 1772).
12 August – Robert Stewart, Viscount Castlereagh, politician, represented the United Kingdom at the Congress of Vienna (born 1769).
John Bowden, ecclesiastical architect.

References

 
Years of the 19th century in Ireland
1820s in Ireland
Ireland
 Ireland